Leitner is  an Austrian-German surname. Notable people with the surname include:

Alan Leitner (born 1947), American artist
Aloysius Leitner, United States Marine Corps
Anton G. Leitner (born 1961), German writer and publisher
Dummy Leitner (1872–1960), American baseball player
Edward Frederick Leitner (1812–1838), German physician and botanist
Erika Leitner, Italian luger
Ferdinand Leitner (1912–1996), German conductor
Franz Leitner (motorcyclist) (born 1968), Austrian motorcycle speedway rider
Franz Leitner (politician) (1918–2005), Austrian politician
Friedrich Leitner (1874–1945), German economist
Gottlieb Wilhelm Leitner (1840–1899), Anglo-Hungarian orientalist
Hias Leitner (born 1935), Austrian alpine skier
Jan Leitner (born 1953), Czech athlete
Karl Leitner (born 1937), Austrian sprint canoer
Karl Gottfried von Leitner (1800–1890), Austrian writer
Ludwig Leitner (1940–2013), West German alpine skier
Miroslav Leitner (born 1966), Slovak ski mountaineer
Moritz Leitner (born 1992), German footballer
Patric Leitner (born 1977), German luger
Sebastian Leitner (1919–1989), Austrian-German science popularizer, journalist and author, inventor of the Leitner system using flashcards
Tammy Leitner (born 1972), U.S. journalist and reality television contestant
Tarek Leitner (born 1972), Austrian news presenter
Ted Leitner, American sportscaster
Thea Leitner (born 1921), Austrian writer
Vladimir Leitner (born 1974), Slovak footballer
Walter Leitner, German chemist
Wolfgang Leitner (born 1953), Austrian businessman

See also
Leitner Creek, a small tributary of the Upper Mississippi River
Leitner Ropeways, an Italian ropeway manufacturer

German-language surnames
German toponymic surnames